The Hurff Ackerman Saunders Federal Building and Robert Boochever U.S. Courthouse (Known to locals simply as "the Federal Building") is a United States Federal Building, United States Post Office and Federal court, located in Juneau, Alaska. Built in 1964 and completed in 1966, the structure is located at 709 W. 9th Street, on the outskirts of downtown, near the Juneau-Douglas Bridge and across the street from the downtown Capital City Fire/Rescue station. The building serves as the official federal representation for the capital city of Alaska.

Managed by the General Services Administration, the building has nine floors, plus a basement and mezzanine level. The building is located next to Gold Creek, a natural watershed which has been lined with concrete, carrying runoff from Mount Juneau.

Tenants
The building contains the Juneau offices and chambers of the U.S. District Court for the District of Alaska. It also contains offices for major federal agencies, including:
 Board of Immigration Appeals
 Environmental Protection Agency
 Federal Bureau of Investigation
 Federal Highway Administration
 Federal Housing Authority
 National Oceanic and Atmospheric Administration
 Robert Boochever United States Courthouse
 Social Security Administration
 United States Army Corps of Engineers
 United States Coast Guard
 United States Department of Agriculture
 United States Forest Service
 United States Postal Service
 United States Veterans Administration
Reach, Inc., a Juneau-based non-profit organization, operates the 9th Street Cafe, a restaurant on the Second Floor.

Hurff Ackerman Saunders and Robert Boochever
Hurff Ackerman Saunders was born July 29, 1903 in South Dakota, and moved to Alaska in 1941 while it was still a US territory. Saunders obtained a civilian position with the Coast Guard, working as a civil engineer. During World War II, Saunders made numerous corrections to the nautical maps of the period, making the Alaskan waters much safer for the US Navy and Coast Guard. Prior to his retirement, Saunders completed building the Federal Building which went on to bear his name. Hurff Saunders died in Juneau on August 29, 1996, at the age of 93.

Robert Boochever was born October 2, 1917 in New York City, and was a United States federal judge and a Justice of the Alaska Supreme Court. Boochever became an associate justice of the Alaska Supreme Court in 1972, and served until 1980. From 1975 until 1978, Boochever served as Chief Justice. in 1980, President Jimmy Carter appointed Boochever to a seat on the United States Court of Appeals for the Ninth Circuit, where he served until his death on October 9, 2011 at the age of 94.

See also
List of United States federal courthouses in Alaska

References

1966 establishments in Alaska
Federal buildings in the United States
Buildings and structures in Juneau, Alaska
Courthouses in Alaska
Federal courthouses in the United States
General Services Administration
Government buildings completed in 1966
Post office buildings in Alaska
Leadership in Energy and Environmental Design basic silver certified buildings